Ladislav Benýšek (born March 25, 1975) is a Czech former professional ice hockey defenceman who played 161 games in the National Hockey League with the Edmonton Oilers and Minnesota Wild between 1997 and 2003. The rest of his career, which lasted from 1992 to 2013, was mainly spent in various European leagues. Internationally Benýšek played for the Czech national team at three World Championships, winning gold in both 1999 and 2000].

Career
Benýšek was selected by the Oilers in the 11th round of the 1994 NHL Entry Draft, 266th overall, after spending the previous season with his hometown HC Olomouc of the Czech league. Following the draft, Benýšek came over to North America, and spent the 1994–95 season with the Cape Breton Oilers, Edmonton's American Hockey League farm team.

Benýšek returned to Europe for the next two seasons, playing for Olomouc and Sparta Praha. Electing to again spend a season in North America, Benýšek played his first NHL hockey in the 1997–98 season, going pointless in two games. Aside from that brief stint, however, Benýšek was again confined to the AHL, where he played for the Hamilton Bulldogs.  Despite eventually being claimed off waivers by the Mighty Ducks of Anaheim, Benýšek would spend the next three seasons back with Sparta Praha.

It was not until the 2000 NHL Expansion Draft, when the newly formed Minnesota Wild selected Benýšek from the Ducks that he got the opportunity to play regular minutes.  For the next two seasons, Benýšek was an integral part of the Wild blueline. In his third season with the Wild, Benysek played only 14 games before being assigned to the AHL's Houston Aeros.  Following the completion of the season, Benýšek returned to Europe, where he joined HIFK in Finland's SM-liiga and also had a spell in Sweden with Leksands IF. In 2006, Benýšek rejoined Sparta Praha for a third spell which lasted one season before he moved to France's Ligue Magnus for Dragons de Rouen. In 2008, Benýšek moved to Denmark's Oddset Ligaen with TOTEMPO HvIK. He then spent three seasons in Italy before moving to the United Kingdom to play for the Braehead Clan based in Glasgow, Scotland, where he would play just nine games, before retiring.

Career statistics

Regular season and playoffs

International

References

External links
 

1975 births
Living people
Asiago Hockey 1935 players
Braehead Clan players
Copenhagen Hockey players
Czech ice hockey defencemen
Edmonton Oilers draft picks
Edmonton Oilers players
HC Olomouc players
HC Sparta Praha players
HC Valpellice players
HIFK (ice hockey) players
Houston Aeros (1994–2013) players
Leksands IF players
Minnesota Wild players
Minnesota Wild scouts
Rouen HE 76 players
SHC Fassa players
Sportspeople from Olomouc
Czech expatriate ice hockey players in the United States
Czech expatriate ice hockey players in Canada
Czech expatriate sportspeople in Italy
Czech expatriate ice hockey players in Sweden
Czech expatriate ice hockey players in Finland
Czech expatriate sportspeople in Denmark
Czech expatriate sportspeople in Scotland
Czech expatriate sportspeople in France
Expatriate ice hockey players in Scotland
Expatriate ice hockey players in France
Expatriate ice hockey players in Italy